Fraser River Provincial Park is a provincial park in British Columbia, Canada. It is 4,899 ha. in size and is located along the Fraser River.

References

Provincial parks of British Columbia
Year of establishment missing